Gérard Farison (15 March 1944 – 8 September 2021) was a French professional footballer who played as a defender.

References

External links
 
 
federation official site 
Profile

1944 births
2021 deaths
Footballers from Saint-Étienne
French footballers
Association football defenders
France international footballers
Ligue 1 players
AS Saint-Étienne players
French football managers